This is an article about qualification for the 2017 Men's European Volleyball Championship.

Qualification summary

Pool standing procedure
 Number of matches won
 Match points
 Sets ratio
 Points ratio
 Result of the last match between the tied teams

Match won 3–0 or 3–1: 3 match points for the winner, 0 match points for the loser
Match won 3–2: 2 match points for the winner, 1 match point for the loser

Direct qualification
The host country team(s) and the best ranked teams in 2015 European Championship, total 7 teams, directly qualified for 2017 European Championship.

First round
First round was held 19–22 May 2016. 12 teams competed in three first round tournaments consisting of 4 teams. The three 1st placed teams and the two 2nd placed teams with the best score qualified for the second round.

Pools composition

All times are local.

Pool 1
Venue:  New Volleyball Arena, Tbilisi, Georgia

|}

|}

Pool 2
Venue:  d'Coque Gymnase, Luxembourg City, Luxembourg

|}

|}

Pool 3
Venue:  Sotra Arena, Straume, Norway

|}

|}

Ranking of the 2nd placed teams

|}

Second round
24 teams competed in the second round, where each pool of 4 teams played in 2 tournaments in 15–25 September 2016. The 1st placed teams of each pool qualified directly for the 2017 Championship. The 2nd placed teams of each pool qualified for the third round.

Pools composition

All times are local.

Pool A

|}

Tournament 1
Venue:  Morača Sports Center, Podgorica, Montenegro

|}

Tournament 2
Venue:  Centro Insular de Deportes, Las Palmas, Spain

|}

Pool B

|}

Tournament 1
Venue:  Humlehøjhallen, Sønderborg, Denmark

|}

Tournament 2
Venue:  Helsinki Ice Hall, Helsinki, Finland

|}

Pool C

|}

Tournament 1
Venue:  Kozani New Indoor Sporthall, Kozani, Greece

|}

Tournament 2
Venue:  Lotto Arena, Antwerp, Belgium

|}

Pool D

|}

Tournament 1
Venue:  Poprad Ice Stadium, Poprad, Slovakia

|}

Tournament 2
Venue:  Dvorana Gimnasium, Rovinj, Croatia

|}

Pool E

|}

Tournament 1
Venue:  Yildirim Beyazit Sports Hall, Turgutlu, Turkey

|}

Tournament 2
Venue:  Topsportcentrum de Koog, Koog aan de Zaan, Netherlands

|}

Pool F

|}

Tournament 1
Venue:  Sala Polivalentă, Craiova, Romania

|}

Tournament 2
Venue:  Jablonec City Hall, Jablonec nad Nisou, Czech Republic

|}

Third round
The 2nd placed teams of the second round will play one home and one away match to determine the 3 winners who will then subsequently be qualified through to the 2017 Championship. The third round matches will be held on 1–9 October 2016.

|}

First leg

|}

Second leg

|}

References

External links
Official website

Q
2016 in volleyball
Qualification for volleyball competitions
Volleyball
Volleyball